Takaya Yasue (born 15 January 1996) is a Japanese swimmer. He competed in the men's 50 metre butterfly event at the 2018 FINA World Swimming Championships (25 m), in Hangzhou, China.

References

External links
 

1996 births
Living people
Japanese male butterfly swimmers
Place of birth missing (living people)
21st-century Japanese people